The Mahury is an extended estuary of French Guiana southeast of Cayenne.

References

Rivers of French Guiana
Rivers of France